Hockey in India may refer to:

Field hockey in India
Ice hockey in India